David Allen Chamberlain (born August 11, 1949, in Canton, Ohio) is an American sculptor, painter, and educator. His artistic compositions appear in the permanent collections of arts institutions, museums, colleges and independent collections around the world.

This works are featured in the permanent collections of arts institutions and museums, including the Delaware Art Museum, the Asian Art Museum, San Francisco; the Smithsonian American Art Museum Renwick Gallery, Washington DC. and the Princeton University Art Museum, Princeton, NJ.

Early life and education 
Chamberlain was born in Canton, Ohio. He was deeply influenced by the cultural, musical, and artistic movements of the 1960s and 1970s (especially involving jazz and improvisation) and by the nature of human composition and the visual language.

Career 
Painter/sculptor

Chamberlain has been a full-time artist since 1977. He creates abstract paintings via The Chamberlain Method of monotype oil painting, a unique studio process that he has developed. He uses a light table, carefully arranged overhead mirrors, and hands – without brushes. Several hundred painting compositions of this type have been created since 1994, exploring a variety of music-related themes and aesthetic directions; many of which appear in museum collections. They embody the combined characteristics of original oil paintings, graphic works run through an etching press, and drawings formed by virtuoso marks made by hand on paper.

This technique makes possible the intense collaborations he is known for, Duett Painting, where he and a painting partner work jointly on the same painting at the same time. This mutual and simultaneous way for two visual composers to create images together attempts to integrate the backgrounds and reveal the characters of each participant, directly, and profoundly.

Musician 

Chamberlain is an a cappella singer with three recording albums and over 700 concerts. For over four decades he has sung bass, performed with and arranged for the mixed a quartet Cahoots based in New Haven, CT and less frequently with the 1971 Footnote Quartet.  Prior to that, he performed with the mixed Octet All Good Children based in Princeton, NJ. During his undergraduate years he sang bass with the Princeton Footnotes and was its president.[28] In high school, he formed the nationally recognized Coachmen Four folk quartet based in Lewis County, New York, and performed with several select regional choruses (baritone) and instrumental bands (cornet).

Educator

Chamberlain has been a Visiting Professor at Clemson University and a Presidential Fellow at the University South Carolina. He was co-founder and Director of the multi-disciplinary Arts College House, University of Pennsylvania. He has been a visiting artist/professor at other educational institutions including Rivier College, Bentley College, Williams College, Rhode Island School of Design, SUNY Albany, The Haverford School, The College of Charleston, Syracuse University, Missouri Valley College, The African Institute of Art (FUNDA) and the Lyme Academy of Fine Arts.

Collaborations

In 1995, in developing his collaborative approach to Duett Painting, he was among the first American artists to do a post-war cultural exchange with Vietnam. In 1997, in expanding the scope and depth of his collaborative Duett Painting methodology he was among the first American artists to do a post-Apartheid cultural exchange with emerging artists in the Republic of South Africa (RSA). These early collaborations paved the way for what has become a powerful multicultural contribution to the milieu.

Studio Duetts  (including affiliations with the Conference on World Affairs, Boulder CO)

Duetts with: Yuji Kishimoto (Architect -- Japan/USA), Emi Tajima (Japanese artist, master calligrapher), Nguyen Quynh Nhu (Vietnamese artist), Eduardo Chavez & Arturo Miranda (Mexican artists), Kyi May Kaung (Burmese Poet), Patrick Moraz (Swiss/American composer/performer), Jingalu (Aboriginal Australian artist), Rungsak Dokbua (Thailand artist), and Americans Don Grusin (Composer/performer), Dave Grusin (Composer/performer), Harry Skoler (Composer/performer), Sarah Schneider (Dancer/choreographer), Sally Ranney (artist/humanist), Cleo Parker Robinson (Dancer/choreographer), Richard Royce (master printmaker), and Melissa Matson (RPO Principal Violist, fabric artist).

Chamberlain was a panelist at the annual Conference on World Affairs (CWA) for several years in the 1990s, where he represented the creative arts (performing, visual, literary).

Publications

·        Film segment Video Jukebox DeCordova Museum of Art, Lincoln, MA 1999

·        Film David Chamberlain: Artistry in Motion {30 minutes} SC-ETV/PBS 1992 [YouTube]

·        Book Melodic Forms: The Sculpture of David Chamberlain {75 pages, color} 1990, David Godine, Publisher Boston, MA [27]

·        Videotape Search for Perfection; {16 minutes} FIS/Pucker Safrai 1982 [YouTube]

References

1949 births
Living people
People from Canton, Ohio
American sculptors
Princeton University alumni
University of Pennsylvania alumni
University of Colorado alumni